Maurice Breton (August 15, 1909 – June 3, 2001) was a Canadian politician and lawyer. He was acclaimed after the resignation of Georges-Émile Lapalme to the House of Commons of Canada in a 1950 by-election as a member of the Liberal Party to represent the riding of Joliette—l'Assomption—Montcalm. He was re-elected in 1953 and 1957 and lost the election of 1958.

External links
 

1909 births
2001 deaths
Lawyers in Quebec
Liberal Party of Canada MPs
Members of the House of Commons of Canada from Quebec
People from Joliette